Ray Clemons (June 4, 1912 – November 26, 1980) was an American wrestler. He competed in the men's freestyle light heavyweight at the 1936 Summer Olympics. He also played professional football for the Detroit Lions in 1939.

References

External links
 

1912 births
1980 deaths
American male sport wrestlers
Olympic wrestlers of the United States
Wrestlers at the 1936 Summer Olympics
People from Jackson County, Oklahoma
Detroit Lions players